Ed Park (born 1970 in Buffalo, New York) is an American journalist and novelist. He was the executive editor of Penguin Press.

Career
Park was a founding editor of the magazine The Believer in 2003, and has been an editor at the Poetry Foundation, as well as the editor of the Village Voices Literary Supplement. Beginning in August 2006, soon after he lost his job at the Village Voice, he circulated a PDF-only newsletter called "The New-York Ghost". From 2007 to 2011, he wrote the science-fiction column "Astral Weeks" for the Los Angeles Times. In May 2008, his debut novel Personal Days was published by Random House. It was a finalist for that year's Hemingway Foundation/PEN Award, the Center for Fiction First Novel Prize (then known as the John Sargent Sr. First Novel Prize), and the Asian American Literary Award. It was also named one of the ten best fiction books of the year by Time. His stories, articles, and humor have appeared in The New Yorker.

In 2011, he was hired by Amazon Publishing as a senior editor, where he was in charge of the company's literary side. After hiring him, Amazon later gave him his own imprint, Little A. He earned Amazon a major literary prize while working there. He has written introductions to several books, including Anthony Powell's Afternoon Men, and co-edited three anthologies: Read Hard and Read Harder (both with Heidi Julavits), and Buffalo Noir (with Brigid Hughes). In 2014, it was reported that he had been hired by Penguin Press as executive editor. He has taught in the graduate writing program at Columbia University.

Personal life
Park received his English degree from Yale University and his M.F.A. from Columbia University. As of 2014, he lives on Manhattan's Upper West Side with his wife and two sons.

References

External links

Living people
1970 births
Writers from Buffalo, New York
American magazine editors
The Village Voice people
Los Angeles Times people
Yale University alumni
Columbia University School of the Arts alumni
Novelists from New York (state)
People from the Upper West Side